is a 1978 shoot 'em up arcade game developed by Tomohiro Nishikado. It was manufactured and sold by Taito in Japan, and licensed to the Midway division of Bally for overseas distribution. Space Invaders was the first fixed shooter and set the template for the shoot 'em up genre. The goal is to defeat wave after wave of descending aliens with a horizontally moving laser to earn as many points as possible.

Designer Nishikado drew inspiration from North American target shooting games like Breakout (1976) and Gun Fight (1975), as well as science fiction narratives such as the novel The War of the Worlds (1897), the anime Space Battleship Yamato (1974), and the film Star Wars (1977). To complete development of the game, he had to design custom hardware and development tools. Upon release, Space Invaders was an immediate commercial success; by 1982, it had grossed $3.8 billion (equivalent to over  adjusted for inflation ), with a net profit of $450 million (equivalent to  adjusted for inflation). This made it the best-selling video game and highest-grossing entertainment product at the time, and the highest-grossing video game of all time.

Space Invaders is considered one of the most influential video games of all time. It ushered in the golden age of arcade video games. It was the inspiration for numerous video games and game designers across different genres, and has been ported and re-released in various forms. The 1980 Atari VCS version quadrupled sales of the VCS, thereby becoming the first killer app for video game consoles. More broadly, the pixelated enemy alien has become a pop culture icon, often representing video games as a whole.

Gameplay

Space Invaders is a fixed shooter in which the player moves a laser cannon horizontally across the bottom of the screen and fires at aliens overhead. The aliens begin as five rows of eleven that move left and right as a group, shifting downward each time they reach a screen edge. The goal is to eliminate all of the aliens by shooting them. While the player has three lives, the game ends immediately if the invaders reach the bottom of the screen. The aliens attempt to destroy the player's cannon by firing projectiles. The laser cannon is partially protected by stationary defense bunkers which are gradually destroyed from the top by the aliens and, if the player fires when beneath one, the bottom gets destroyed.

As aliens are defeated, their movement and the game's music both speed up. Defeating all the aliens brings another wave which starts lower, a loop which can continue endlessly. A special "mystery ship" will occasionally move across the top of the screen and award bonus points if destroyed.

Development
Space Invaders was developed by Japanese designer Tomohiro Nishikado, who spent a year designing the game and developing the necessary hardware to produce it. The game was a response to Atari's arcade game Breakout (1976). Nishikado wanted to adapt the same sense of achievement and tension from destroying targets one at a time, combining it with elements of target shooting games. The game uses a similar layout to that of Breakout but with different game mechanics; rather than bounce a ball to attack static objects, players are given the ability to fire projectiles at moving enemies.

Nishikado added several interactive elements that he found lacking in earlier video games, such as the ability for enemies to react to the player's movement and fire back, and a game over triggered by the enemies killing the player (either by getting hit or enemies reaching the bottom of the screen) rather than simply a timer running out. He replaced the timer, typical of arcade games at the time, with descending aliens who effectively served a similar function, where the closer they came, the less time the player had left.

Early enemy designs for the game included tanks, combat planes, and battleships. Nishikado, however, was not satisfied with the enemy movements; technical limitations made it difficult to simulate flying. Humans would have been easier to simulate, but the designer considered shooting them immoral. After the release of the 1974 anime Space Battleship Yamato in Japan, and seeing a magazine feature about Star Wars (1977), he thought of using a space theme. Nishikado drew inspiration for the aliens from a novel by H. G. Wells, The War of the Worlds, and created initial bitmap images after the octopus-like aliens. Other alien designs were modeled after squids and crabs. The game was originally titled Space Monsters after a popular song in Japan at the time, "Monster", but was changed to Space Invaders by the designer's superiors.

Hardware

Nishikado designed his own custom hardware and development tools for the game. The game uses an Intel 8080 central processing unit (CPU), displays raster graphics on a CRT monitor using a bitmapped framebuffer, and uses monaural sound hosted by a combination of analog circuitry and a Texas Instruments SN76477 sound chip. The adoption of a microprocessor was inspired by Gun Fight (1975), Midway's microprocessor adaptation of Nishikado's earlier discrete logic game Western Gun, after the designer was impressed by the improved graphics and smoother animation of Midway's version.  Space Invaders also adopted the multi-chip barrel shifter circuit first developed by Midway for Gun Fight, which had been a key part of that game's smoother animation. This circuit allowed the 8080 CPU to shift pictures in the graphics framebuffer faster than it could using only its own native instructions.

Despite the specially developed hardware, Nishikado was unable to program the game as he wanted—the Control Program board was not powerful enough to display the graphics in color or move the enemies faster—and he ended up considering the development of the game's hardware the most difficult part of the whole process. While programming the game, Nishikado discovered that the processor was able to render each frame of the alien's animation graphics faster when there were fewer aliens on the screen. Since the alien's positions updated after each frame, this caused the aliens to move across the screen at an increasing speed as more and more were destroyed. Rather than design a compensation for the speed increase, he decided that it was a feature, not a bug, and kept it as a challenging gameplay mechanism.

Taito released Space Invaders in July 1978. They released both an upright arcade cabinet and a so-called "cocktail-table" cabinet; following its usual practice, Taito named the cocktail version T.T. Space Invaders ("T.T." for "table-top"). Midway released its upright version a few months later and its cocktail version several months after that. The cabinet artwork featured large humanoid monsters not present in the game; Nishikado attributes this to the artist basing the designs on the original title of "Space Monsters", rather than referring to the actual in-game graphics. In the upright cabinets, the game graphics are generated on a hidden CRT monitor and reflected toward the player using a semi-transparent mirror, behind which is mounted a plastic cutout of a moon bolted against a painted starry background. The backdrop is visible through the mirror and thus appears "behind" the graphics. Both Taito's and Midway's first Space Invaders versions had black-and-white graphics with a transparent colored overlay using strips of orange and green cellophane over certain portions of the screen to add color to the image. Later Japanese releases used a rainbow-colored cellophane overlay, and these were eventually followed by versions with a color monitor and an electronically generated color overlay.

Music

Despite its simplicity, the music to Space Invaders was revolutionary for the gaming industry of the time. Video game scholar Andrew Schartmann identifies three aspects of the music that had a significant impact on the development of game music:
 Whereas video game music prior to Space Invaders was restricted to the extremities (i.e., a short introductory theme with game-over counterpart), the alien-inspired hit featured continuous musicthe well-known four-note loop, consisting of the first four notes of the descending D minor natural scalethroughout, uninterrupted by sound effects: "It was thus the first time that sound effects and music were superimposed to form a rich sonic landscape. Not only do players receive feedback related directly to their actions through sound effects; they also receive stimulus in a more subtle, non-interactive fashion through music."
 The music interacts with on-screen animation to influence the emotions of the player: "That seemingly pedestrian four-note loop might stir us in the most primitive of ways, but that it stirs us at all is worthy of note. By demonstrating that game sound could be more than a simple tune to fill the silence, Space Invaders moved video game music closer to the realm of art."
 The music for Space Invaders popularized the notion of variability—the idea that music can change in accordance with the ongoing on-screen narrative. The variable in Space Invaders, the tempo, is admittedly simple, but its implications are not to be underestimated. "Over the years, analogous strategies of variation would be applied to pitch, rhythm, dynamics, form, and a host of other parameters, all with the goal of accommodating the nonlinear aspect of video games."

Next Generation editor Neil West also cited the Space Invaders music as an example of great video game art, commenting on how the simple melody's increasing tempo and synchronization with the enemies' movement chills and excites the player.

Reception and versions

Arcade version
When Nishikado completed the game, it was initially met with a mixed response from within Taito and among amusement arcade owners. His colleagues praised it, applauding his achievement while queuing up to play, whereas his bosses predicted low sales as games often ended more quickly than other timer-based arcade games at the time. A number of amusement arcade owners initially rejected the game, but some pachinko parlors and bowling alleys adopted it; it quickly caught on, with many parlors and alleys clearing space for more Space Invaders cabinets. In the first few months following its release in Japan, Space Invaders became popular, and specialty video arcades opened with nothing but Space Invaders cabinets.

By the end of 1978, Taito had installed over 100,000 machines and grossed  ( adjusted for inflation) in Japan alone. However, this was not enough to meet the high demand, leading to Taito increasing production to 25,000–30,000 units per month and raising projections to 400,000 manufactured in Japan by the end of 1979. In order to cope with the demand, Taito licensed the overseas rights to Midway for distribution outside of Japan. By the end of 1979, an estimated 750,000 Space Invaders machines were installed worldwide, including 400,000 in Japan, 85,000 in the United Kingdom, and 60,000 within a year in the United States (where prices ranged from $2,000 to $3,000 for each machine); the game eventually sold 72,000 units in the United States by 1982. By 1979, it had become the arcade game industry's all-time best-seller.

Space Invaders machines had grossed more than four billion US quarters ( at the time, or  adjusted for inflation) by 1979. It remained the top arcade game for three years through 1980. By 1982, it had crossed $2 billion in quarters (equivalent to $ adjusted for inflation), with a net profit of $450 million (equivalent to $ adjusted for inflation). This made it the best-selling video game and highest-grossing "entertainment product" of its time, with comparisons made to the then highest-grossing film Star Wars, which had grossed $486 million, with a net profit of $175 million.

Home versions
The 1980 Atari VCS (Atari 2600) version was the first official licensing of an arcade game for consoles and became the first "killer app" for video game consoles after quadrupling the system's sales. Space Invaders for the Atari 2600 had sold  cartridges by 1983, and a further  between 1986 and 1990, for a total of over  cartridges sold by 1990.

Other official conversions were released for the Atari 8-bit computer line and Atari 5200 console, while Taito later released it for the Nintendo Famicom in 1985, but only in Japan. By 1982, versions of Space Invaders were available for handheld electronic game devices, tabletop dedicated consoles, home computers, watches and pocket calculators. The Atari VCS conversion was programmed by Richard Maurer, while the Atari 5200 conversion was programmed by Eric Manghise and animated by Marilyn Churchill.

More than a hundred Space Invaders video game clones were released for various platforms, such as the popular computer games Super Invader (1979) and TI Invaders (1981); the latter was the top-selling game for the TI-99/4A through at least 1982.

Legacy 
As one of the earliest shooting games, Space Invaders set precedents and helped pave the way for future titles and for the shooting genre. Space Invaders popularized a more interactive style of gameplay, with the enemies responding to the player-controlled cannon's movement, and was the first video game to popularize the concept of achieving a high score, being the first to save the player's score. While earlier shooting games allowed the player to shoot at targets, Space Invaders was the first in which multiple enemies could fire back at the player, and in contrast to earlier arcade games which often had a timer, Space Invaders introduced the "concept of going round after round." It was also the first game where players were given multiple lives, had to repel hordes of enemies, could take cover from enemy fire, and use destructible barriers, in addition to being the first game to use a continuous background soundtrack, with four simple diatonic descending bass notes repeating in a loop, which was dynamic and changed pace during stages, like a heartbeat sound that increases pace as enemies approached.

An urban legend states that Space Invaders' popularity led to a shortage of 100-yen coins in Japan. However, Nishikado himself was skeptical of the story. In actuality, 100-yen coin production was lower in 1978 and 1979 than in previous or subsequent years. Additionally, arcade operators would have emptied their machines and taken the money to the bank, thus keeping the coins in circulation. Reports from those living in Japan at the time indicate "nothing out of the ordinary ... during the height of the Space Invaders invasion".

Space Invaders was inducted into the World Video Game Hall of Fame in 2016. Space Invaders cabinets have become collector's items, with the cocktail and cabaret versions being the rarest.

Impact 
Game developers including Shigeru Miyamoto (creator of the franchises Donkey Kong, Mario, and The Legend of Zelda), Hideo Kojima (Metal Gear), Satoshi Tajiri (Pokémon), and John Romero and John Carmack (both Doom) have cited Space Invaders as their introduction to video games. Miyamoto said Space Invaders had revolutionized the video game industry. According to Alexander Smith, by "allowing targets to attack the player and eliminating the timer, Nishikado created a new paradigm in video games." It also inspired Eugene Jarvis (Defender, Robotron: 2084) to become a video game designer, stating it "laid the groundwork for a whole generation" of video games with the "animated characters, the story, this amazing crescendo of action and climax" and that many games "still rely on the multiple life, progressively difficult level paradigm" of Space Invaders. Deus Ex creator Warren Spector said: "Space Invaders and games like it represent the roots of everything we see today in gaming. It represents the birth of a new art form, one that literally changed the world. Space Invaders is important as an historical artefact, no less than the silent films of the early twentieth century or early printed books."

Edge attributed the shift of games from bars and amusement arcades to more mainstream locations, such as restaurants and department stores, to Space Invaders. Its popularity was such that it was the first game where an arcade machine's owner could make up for the cost of the machine in under one month, or in some places within one week.

Space Invaders helped action games become the dominant genre in arcades and on consoles. Guinness World Records considered Space Invaders one of the most successful arcade shooting games by 2008. In describing it as a "seminal arcade classic", IGN listed it as the number eight "classic shoot 'em up". Space Invaders set the template for the shoot 'em up genre. Its worldwide success created a demand for a wide variety of science fiction games, inspiring the development of arcade games, such as Atari's Asteroids, Williams Electronics' Defender, and Namco's Galaxian and Galaga, which were modeled after Space Invaderss gameplay and design. This influence could be said to extend to most shooting games released to the present day, including first-person shooters (FPS) such as Wolfenstein, Doom, Halo and Call of Duty. Space Invaders also influenced other genres, including maze games such as Sega/Gremlin's Head On (1979) which adopted the concept of "going round after round" instead of a timer, and early computer dungeon crawl games such as Dungeons of Daggorath, which used similar heartbeat sounds to indicate player health.

The technology journalist Jason Whittaker credited Space Invaders with ending the video game crash of 1977, caused by Pong clones flooding the market, and beginning the golden age of video arcade games (1978–1980s). According to The Observer, home console versions of Space Invaders were popular and encouraged users to learn to program; many became industry leaders. 1UP.com stated that Space Invaders showed that video games could compete against the major entertainment media at the time: films, music, and television. IGN attributed the launch of the "arcade phenomenon" in North America in part to Space Invaders. Electronic Games said it was the impetus behind video gaming becoming a rapidly growing hobby, and as "the single most popular coin-operated attraction of all time." Game Informer considered it, along with Pac-Man, one of the most popular arcade games; it tapped into popular culture and generated excitement during the golden age of arcades.

Rankings 
In 1995, Flux magazine ranked Space Invaders #1 on their "Top 100 Video Games." In 1996, Next Generation magazine put Space Invaders at number 97 on their list of the "Top 100 Games of All Time", saying that it "provides an elegance and simplicity not found in later games like Phoenix [1980]." IGN listed it as one of the "Top 10 Most Influential Games" in 2007, citing it as a source of inspiration to video game designers and the impact it had on the shooting genre. The Times ranked it No. 1 on its list of "The ten most influential video games ever" in 2007. 1UP ranked it at No. 3 on its list of "The 60 Most Influential Games of All Time," stating that, in contrast to earlier arcade games which "were attempts to simulate already-existing things," Space Invaders was "the first video game as a video game, instead of merely a playable electronic representation of something else."

In 2008, Guinness World Records listed it as the top-rated arcade game in technical, creative, and cultural impact. Entertainment Weekly named Space Invaders one of the top ten games for the Atari 2600 home console in 2013. In 2018, it was ranked 87th in Video Game Canon's statistical meta-analysis of 48 "top games" lists published between 1995 and 2017. The list aggregator site Playthatgame currently ranks Space Invaders as the 57th top game of all time, game of the year, & game of the 1970s. In 2021, The Guardian listed it as the third greatest video game of the 1970s, just below Galaxian and Asteroids.

Remakes and sequels

Space Invaders has been remade on numerous platforms and spawned many sequels. Re-releases include ported and updated versions of the original arcade game. Ported versions generally feature different graphics and additional gameplay options—for example, moving defense bunkers, zigzag shots, invisible aliens, and two-player cooperative gameplay. Ports on earlier systems like the Atari home consoles featured simplified graphics, while later systems such as the Super Nintendo Entertainment System and PlayStation featured updated graphics. Later titles include several modes of gameplay and integrate new elements into the original design. For example, Space Invaders Extreme, released on the Nintendo DS and PlayStation Portable, integrated musical elements into the standard gameplay. A 2008 spin-off for WiiWare, Space Invaders Get Even, allows players to control the aliens instead of the laser cannon in a reversal of roles.

In 1980, Bally-Midway released a pinball version of the game. However, few elements from the original game are included, and the aliens instead resemble the xenomorphs from the film Alien; Bally-Midway was later sued over the game's resemblance to the designs by H. R. Giger. It became the third highest-grossing pinball machine of 1980 in the United States.

Ports of the game have been met with mixed receptions; the Atari 2600 version was successful, while the Nintendo Entertainment System version was poorly received.

Taito has released several arcade sequels. The first was Space Invaders Part II in 1979; it featured color graphics, an attract mode, new gameplay elements, and added an intermission between gameplay. According to the Killer List of Video Games, this was the first video game to include an intermission. The game also allowed the player with the top score to sign their name on the high score table. This version was released in the United States as Deluxe Space Invaders (also known as Space Invaders Deluxe), but it featured a different graphical color scheme and a lunar-city background. Another arcade sequel, Space Invaders II, was released exclusively in the United States. It was in a cocktail-table format with very fast alien firing and a competitive two-player mode. During the summer of 1985, Return of the Invaders was released with updated color graphics and more complex movements and attack patterns for the aliens. Subsequent arcade sequels included Super Space Invaders '91, Space Invaders DX, and Space Invaders 95. Each game introduced minor gameplay additions to the original design. Like the original game, several of the arcade sequels have become collector's items, though some are considered rarer. In 2002, Taito released Space Raiders, a third-person shooter reminiscent of Space Invaders.

The game and its related games have been included in video game compilation titles. Space Invaders Anniversary was released in 2003 for the PlayStation 2 and included nine Space Invader variants. A similar title for the PlayStation Portable, Space Invaders Pocket, was released in 2005. Space Invaders, Space Invaders Part II and Return of the Invaders are included in Taito Legends, a compilation of Taito's classic arcade games released in 2005 on the PlayStation 2, Xbox, and PC. Super Space Invaders '91, Space Invaders DX, and Space Invaders 95 were included in Taito Legends 2, a sequel compilation released in 2006. In April 2017, a redemption game by Raw Thrills, Space Invaders Frenzy, was released.

A stand-alone version was released by Super Impulse as part of its Tiny Arcade series, along with the Namco games Pac-Man, Ms. Pac-Man, and Galaxian.

A Space Invaders title for the Atari Jaguar was being worked on by Virtuality Entertainment, which would have featured support for the unreleased Jaguar VR peripheral; however, the project never entered full development beyond reaching pre-production stages, with the only remaining proof of its existence being a game design document.

In popular culture

Many publications and websites use the pixelated alien graphic as an icon for video games in general, including the video game magazine Electronic Gaming Monthly, technology website Ars Technica, and concert event Video Games Live. There has also been Space Invaders-themed merchandising, including necklaces and puzzles. The trend continues to this day, with handmade sites like Etsy and Pinterest showcasing thousands of handmade items featuring Space Invaders characters.

The game—and references to it—has appeared in numerous facets of popular culture. Soon after the game's release, hundreds of favorable articles and stories about the emerging video game medium as popularized by Space Invaders aired on television and were printed in newspapers and magazines. The Space Invaders Tournament, held by Atari in 1980 and won by Rebecca Heineman, was the first electronic sports (eSports) event, and attracted more than 10,000 participants, establishing video gaming as a mainstream hobby. The Arcade Awards ceremony was created that same year to honor the best video games, with Space Invaders winning the first Game of the Year (GoTY) award. The impact of Space Invaders on the video game industry has been compared to that of The Beatles in the pop music industry. Considered "the first 'blockbuster' video game," Space Invaders became synonymous with video games worldwide for some time.

Within a year of the game's release, the Japanese PTA unsuccessfully attempted to ban the game for allegedly inspiring truancy. In North America, doctors identified a condition called the "Space Invaders elbow" as a complaint, while a physician in The New England Journal of Medicine named a similar ailment the "Space Invaders Wrist". Space Invaders was also the first game to attract political controversy when a 1981 Private Member's Bill known as the "Control of Space Invaders (and other Electronic Games) Bill", drafted by British Labour Member of Parliament (MP) George Foulkes, attempted to allow local councils to restrict the game and those like it by licensing for its "addictive properties" and for causing "deviancy". Conservative MP Michael Brown defended the game as "innocent and harmless pleasure", which he himself had enjoyed that day, and criticized the bill as an example of "Socialist beliefs in restriction and control". A motion to bring the bill before Parliament was defeated by 114 votes to 94 votes; the bill itself was never considered by Parliament. Similarly in the United States, in Westchester County, New York, there was a controversial political debate in 1981 over a resolution to place age restrictions on Space Invaders and other arcade games, following complaints that schoolchildren wasted time and lunch money, and went to school late; the resolution drew national attention.

Music
Musicians have drawn inspiration for their music from Space Invaders. The pioneering Japanese synthpop group Yellow Magic Orchestra reproduced Space Invaders sounds in its 1978 self-titled album and hit single "Computer Game", the latter selling over 400,000 copies in the United States. Other pop songs based on Space Invaders soon followed, including disco records such as "Disco Space Invaders" (1979) by Funny Stuff, and the hit songs "Space Invader" (1980) by The Pretenders, "Space Invaders" (1980) by Uncle Vic, and the Australian hit "Space Invaders" (1979) by Player One (known in the US as 'Playback'), which in turn provided the bassline for Jesse Saunders' "On and On" (1984), the first Chicago house music track. The Clash sampled sound effects from the game on the song "Ivan Meets G.I. Joe" from its 4th studio album, Sandinista!

Video Games Live performed audio from the game as part of a special retro "Classic Arcade Medley" in 2007. In honor of the game's 30th anniversary, Taito produced an album titled Space Invaders 2008. The album was released by Avex Trax and features music inspired by the game. Six songs were originally used in the PSP version of Space Invaders Extreme. Taito's store, Taito Station, also unveiled a Space Invaders-themed music video.

Television and film
In the 1982 original pilot of the series The Powers of Matthew Star, David Star uses his powers to cheat the game. The game is shown with a colored backdrop of the moon. Multiple television series have aired episodes that either reference or parody the game and its elements; for example, Danger Mouse, That '70s Show, Scrubs, Chuck, Robot Chicken, Teenage Mutant Ninja Turtles and The Amazing World of Gumball. Elements are prominently featured in the "Raiders of the Lost Arcade" segment of "Anthology of Interest II", an episode of the animated series Futurama.

Space Invaders also appears in the films Cherry 2000 (1987), Terminator 2: Judgment Day (1991), and Pixels (2015) while its Deluxe game made an appearance in Fast Times At Ridgemont High (1982). A film adaptation of the game is in the works by Warner Bros. Pictures with Akiva Goldsman producing. On February 13, 2015, Daniel Kunka was set to write the script for the film. On July 12, 2019, Greg Russo was set to write the script for the film, with Goldsman still producing alongside Safehouse Pictures partners Joby Harold and Tory Tunnell.

Books

Various books have been published about Space Invaders, including Space Invaders: An addict's guide to battle tactics, big scores and the best machines (1982) by Martin Amis, Tomb Raiders and Space Invaders: Videogame forms and Contexts (2006) by Geof King and Tanya Krzywinska, and Space Invaders (1980) by Mark Roeder and Julian Wolanski.

Miscellaneous

In the mid-1990s, the athletics company Puma released a T-shirt with a stamp having references to Space Invaders, i.e. a spaceship aiming at the company's logo (see picture on the right).

In 2006, the game was one of several video game-related media selected to represent Japan as part of a project compiled by Japan's Agency for Cultural Affairs. That same year, Space Invaders was included in the London Science Museum's Game On exhibition, meant to showcase the various aspects of video game history, development, and culture. (The game is a part of the Barbican Centre's traveling Game On exhibition.)

At the Belluard Bollwerk International 2006 festival in Fribourg, Switzerland, Guillaume Reymond created a three-minute video recreation of a game of Space Invaders as part of the "Gameover" project using humans as pixels. The GH ART exhibit at the 2008 Games Convention in Leipzig, Germany, included an art game, Invaders!, based on Space Invaderss gameplay. The creator later asked for the game to be removed from the exhibit following criticism of elements based on the September 11 attacks in the United States.

There is a bridge in Cáceres, Spain, projected by engineers Pedro Plasencia and Hadrián Arias, whose pavement design is based on the game. The laser cannon, some shots, and several figures can be seen on the deck. A French street artist, Invader, made a name for himself by creating mosaic artwork of Space Invader aliens around the world.

In 2014, two Brazilian zoologists described a new species of arachnid as Taito spaceinvaders. Kury & Barros, 2014, inspired by the game, because of the resemblance of a fleck in the dorsal scutum of the animal to a typical alien in the game. The genus Taito is named for the company that produces Space Invaders.

In 2018, Highways England launched a campaign titled "Don't be a Space Invader, Stay Safe, Stay Back" to raise awareness on the dangers of tailgating. People were also able to order free car bumper stickers to raise awareness of the campaign.

Notes

References

Further reading

External links

 
 
 
 Game manual, for arcade game, stored at archive.org
 Game manual for Atari 2600 game, stored at archive.org

 
1978 video games
Arcade video games
Atari 2600 games
Atari 5200 games
Atari 8-bit family games
BBC Micro and Acorn Electron games
Cancelled Atari Jaguar games
Fixed shooters
Game Boy Advance games
Game Boy Color games
Game Boy games
IOS games
NESiCAxLive games
Midway video games
Mobile games
MSX games
NEC PC-9801 games
PlayStation (console) games
PlayStation Network games
PlayStation Portable games
SG-1000 games
Single-player video games
Super Nintendo Entertainment System games
Taito arcade games
Tiger Electronics handheld games
Vertically-oriented video games
Virtual Boy games
Virtual Console games
Windows games
WonderSwan games
Alien invasions in video games
World Video Game Hall of Fame
Video games developed in Japan